Douglas is an unincorporated community and coal town on the North Fork Blackwater River in Tucker County, West Virginia, United States. Originally known as Albert, the community's name was changed to Douglas by an official Board on Geographic Names decision in 1965. Its post office, however, continued to use the name Albert.

See also 
Douglas, Calhoun County, West Virginia

References 

Unincorporated communities in Tucker County, West Virginia
Unincorporated communities in West Virginia
Coal towns in West Virginia